Dr. Salo Weisselberger (1867–1931, also named Salo von Weisselberger), Jewish politician, jurist and judge, was a member of Bukovina's Landtag during the Austro-Hungarian Empire, Mayor of Czernowitz in 1912–1914, a member of the Senate of Romania, and then a member of its Chamber of Deputies.

Salo Weisselberger was born in Dracynetz, near Czernowitz and studied law at the University of Czernowitz. Based on school achievements he was appointed judge at the Court of railroads and county in 1892. Later, he was elected member of the Regional Parliament (Landtag) of Bukovina from 1911 to 1914 for Benno Straucher's Jewish National People's Party. He became the mayor of Czernowitz in 1913, after having served several years as vice-mayor, and in 1914 he was deported by the Russian occupation troops as a hostage to Siberia, whence he returned to Austria in 1916, after a hostage exchange in November 1915 between Russia and Austria-Hungary. He was ennobled by the Austrian Emperor Franz Joseph for his sufferances.

After the dissolution of Austro-Hungarian Empire, Bukovina became a part of Romania, and Weisselberger was a member of the Romanian Senate from 1922 to 1926 and of the Chamber of Deputies from 1927 to 1928. When elected to the Senate for Czernowitz, he got 3,800 votes against 1,991 for the Social Democrat candidate, the Bundist Leon Gheller. The seat was beforehand occupied by another Social Democrat, George Grigorovici.

He died in March 1931 in a Vienna sanatorium.

See also
 List of mayors of Chernivtsi

Sources

External links
 Photograph of (Salo von) Weisselberger, in: Hugo Gold (ed.), History of the Jews in the Bukowina, Tel Aviv, Volume 1 (1958)

1867 births
1931 deaths
20th-century Romanian lawyers
Austro-Hungarian politicians
Austro-Hungarian people of World War I
Prisoners and detainees of Russia
Members of the Chamber of Deputies (Romania)
Members of the Senate of Romania
Jewish Austro-Hungarian politicians
Politicians from Chernivtsi
People from the Duchy of Bukovina
Bukovina Jews
Austro-Hungarian Jews
Jewish National People's Party politicians
20th-century Austrian lawyers
Jewish Romanian politicians
Romanian memoirists